Celovce may refer to several places in Slovakia

Čelovce, Veľký Krtíš District
Čeľovce - a village in Trebisov District in eastern Kosice Region